SG Braunschweig is a basketball club based in Braunschweig, Germany.

History

The team was formed in 1978 as a cooperation between the basketball sections of the clubs FT Braunschweig and MTV Braunschweig. In 2000–01 the club passed its Basketball Bundesliga license to the newly founded team Metabox Braunschweig (now known as Basketball Löwen Braunschweig), and since then functions as a farm team for the Bundesliga side. From 2007 on, the team competed under the name Spot Up Medien Baskets Braunschweig for sponsorship reasons. In 2014, the name was changed into DRUFF! Baskets Braunschweig.

From 2007 to 2015, SG Braunschweig played in the ProB league, the German third division. After the 2014–15, the club sold its ProB license to the Artland Dragons. Instead, the club entered into a cooperation with MTV Herzöge Wolfenbüttel. Both clubs will field a joined ProB team from 2015 on, which will play in Wolfenbüttel, while SG Braunschweig will continue to operate its own youth teams.

On September 13, 2015, SG Braunschweig announced that they withdrew from the 5th tier 2. Regionalliga Nord-West.

Season by season

Notable former players

  Stephen Arigbabu
  Peter Fehse
  Dennis Schröder (3 seasons: 2010–13)
  Daniel Theis 
  Robin Smeulders (2 seasons: 2004–06)
  Kenny Atkinson (1 season: 1998–99)
  Scooter Barry
  Steven Key
  Zackary Wright
  Štefan Svitek
  Igors Miglinieks

References

External links 
 

Braunschweig, SG
Braunschweig, SG
Basketball Löwen Braunschweig
Sport in Braunschweig
Braunschweig, SG
Organisations based in Braunschweig